Tankhoy is a rural locality (a settlement) in Kabansky District, Republic of Buryatia, Russia. The population was 940 as of 2013. There are 13 streets.

Geography 
Tankhoy is located 129 km southwest of Kabansk (the district's administrative centre) by road. Vydrino is the nearest rural locality.

References 

Rural localities in Kabansky District
Populated places on Lake Baikal